The Chisholm Trail was a trail used in the post-Civil War era to drive cattle overland from ranches in Texas to Kansas railheads. The trail was established by Black Beaver, a Lenape guide and rancher, and his friend Jesse Chisholm, a Cherokee merchant. They collected and drove numerous cattle along the trail to Kansas, where they could be shipped east to achieve higher prices. The southern terminus was Red River Station, a trading post near the Red River along the northern border of Texas. The northern terminus was a trading post near Kansas City, Kansas. Chisholm owned both of these posts. In the years of the cattle drives, cowboys drove large herds from ranches across Texas to the Red River Station and then north to Kansas City.

Overview
Texas ranchers using the Chisholm Trail had their cowboys start cattle drives from either the Rio Grande area or San Antonio. They joined the Chisholm Trail at the Red River, at the border between Texas and Oklahoma Territory. They continued north to the rail head of the Kansas Pacific Railway in Abilene, Kansas, where the cattle would be sold and shipped eastward. The trail is named for Jesse Chisholm, a multiracial trader from Tennessee of half Cherokee descent. Together with scout Black Beaver, he developed the trail to transport his goods from one trading post to another. The two men were the first to drive cattle north along this route.

Business aspects
By 1853, Texas cattle were being driven into Missouri. Local farmers began blocking the herds and turning them back because the Texas Longhorns carried ticks that caused diseases in other species of cattle. Violence, vigilante groups, and cattle rustling caused further problems for the drovers. By 1859, the driving of cattle was outlawed in many Missouri jurisdictions. By the end of the Civil War, most cattle were being moved up the western branch of trail, being gathered at Red River Station in Montague County, Texas.

In 1866, cattle in Texas were worth $4 per head, compared to over $40 per head in the North and East. Lack of market access during the Civil War had produced an overstock of cattle in Texas.  In 1867, Joseph G. McCoy built stockyards in Abilene, Kansas. He encouraged Texas cattlemen to drive their herds to his stockyards.  O. W. Wheeler answered McCoy's call, and he along with partners used the Chisholm Trail to bring a herd of 2,400 head from Texas to Abilene. This herd was the first of an estimated 5,000,000 head of Texas cattle to reach Kansas over the Chisholm Trail. McCoy's stockyards shipped 35,000 head in 1867 and became the largest stockyards west of Kansas City, Kansas.

The construction of the Union Pacific Railway through Nebraska eventually offered a cattle drive destination that was an attractive alternative to the Kansas Pacific Railroad. The Texas Trail emerged as an alternative to the Chisholm Trail. Between 1876 and 1884 some drives went along the Texas Trail instead of the Chisholm Trail.

Route

In Texas, hundreds of feeder trails headed north to one of the main cattle trails. In the early 1840s, most cattle were driven up the Shawnee Trail. The Chisholm Trail was previously used by Indian hunting and raiding parties; the trail crossed into Indian Territory (present-day west-central Oklahoma) near Red River Station and entered Kansas near Caldwell. Through Oklahoma, the route of U.S. Highway 81 follows the Chisholm Trail through present-day towns of El Reno, Duncan, Chickasha, and Enid.

Historians consider the Chisholm Trail to have started either at Donna or San Antonio. From 1867 to 1871, the trail ended in Abilene, Kansas, but as railroads incrementally built southward, the end of the trail moved to other cities.  The end of the trail moved to Newton and soon afterward to Wichita. From 1883 to 1887, the end of the trail was at Caldwell.

Challenges

On the long trips—up to two months—the cattlemen faced many difficulties. They had to cross major rivers such as the Arkansas and the Red and innumerable smaller creeks, as well as handle the topographic challenges of canyons, badlands and low mountain ranges. The major drives typically needed to start in the spring after the rains stimulated the growth of green grasses for the grazing cattle. The spring drives, with those rains and higher water levels with the runoff, always meant more danger at the river crossings, which had no bridges. The half-wild Texas Longhorn cattle were contrary and prone to stampede with little provocation.

The days of longest sunlight, near mid-June, were also an important consideration in the timing of drives. In addition to natural dangers, the cowboys and drovers encountered rustlers and occasional conflicts with Native Americans. The cattle drives disrupted the hunting and cultivation of crops in Indian Territory. Tribal members demanded that the trail bosses pay a toll of 10 cents per head to local tribes for the right to cross Indian lands (Oklahoma at that time was Indian Territory, governed from Fort Smith, Arkansas).

The only woman known to run her own cattle drive traveled from Texas to Wichita using the Chisholm Trail. Margaret Borland took her family, hired hands, and 2,500 Longhorns through the trail in 1873 in search of profit for her cattle, which was worth triple in Kansas over Texas prices. She died from what was called trail fever just after arriving in Wichita, after an otherwise successful journey.

Representation in media
The cattle drives have been a popular topic among Western genre movies. At least 27 movies have portrayed fictional accounts of the first drive along the Chisholm Trail, including The Texans (1938), directed by James P. Hogan and starring Randolph Scott and Joan Bennett; and Red River (1948), directed by Howard Hawks and starring John Wayne and Montgomery Clift. Walter Brennan co-starred in both films.

The trail is the subject of at least two pop songs: "The Last Cowboy Song," written and recorded by Ed Bruce, also performed by The Highwaymen; and the song "The Old Chisholm Trail." Among those who have covered the song are Gene Autry, Girls of the Golden West, Woody Guthrie, Michael Martin Murphey, Tex Ritter, and Roy Rogers. Lead Belly (Huddie Ledbetter) also covered this song, although his version was titled "When I Was A Cowboy". Nova Scotia-born Wilf Carter recorded a version of the song, titled, "Come A Ty-ya Yippie Yi Yo".

Legacy
Many schools in this region have been named after the Chisholm Trail, including:
Chisholm Trail High School in Fort Worth, Texas
Chisholm Trail Middle School in Olathe, Kansas 
Chisholm Trail Middle School in Round Rock, Texas
Chisholm Trail Middle School in Rhome, Texas
Chisholm Trail Elementary School in Park City, Kansas
Chisholm Middle School in Newton, Kansas
Chisholm High School in Enid, Oklahoma
Chisholm Elementary School in Edmond, Oklahoma
Chisholm Trail Elementary School in  Sanger, Texas

The Chisholm Trail is roughly traced by U.S. Route 81 through Oklahoma, and that state has multiple museums and sites paying respect to the trail.  The Chisholm Trail Heritage Center in Duncan, Oklahoma has educational and interactive exhibits, a large monument depicting a scene from a Chisholm Trail cattle drive, and a trail walkway. Trail Ruts at Monument Hill just outside of Duncan has visible traces of cattle hoofs and wagons actually left on the trail.  Kingfisher, Oklahoma, has a life-size statue of Jesse Chisholm in the middle of downtown, as well as the Chisholm Trail Museum and Governor Shea Mansion which gives a clear timeline of the trail.  Yukon, Oklahoma, has the Chisholm Trail Watering Hole and historic marker, while Jesse Chisholm’s gravesite is a bit further north outside Geary, Oklahoma.  A mural in Enid, Oklahoma depicting the trail is located in the downtown area.

Lockhart, Texas, in Caldwell County, holds a four-day festival on the second weekend of June, to celebrate its place on the Chisholm Trail. Newton, Kansas holds a three- to four-day Chisholm Trail Festival, combining it with the annual Fourth of July celebration.

In 2014, the North Texas Tollway Authority constructed a 26-mile-long toll road named after the trail, the Chisholm Trail Parkway. It connects downtown Fort Worth to the nearby city of Cleburne in Johnson County. In 2017, the Texas Historical Commission released The Chisholm Trail: Exploring the Folklore and Legacy, an online tour and mobile app. The tour includes audio tracks and short videos that retell the history of communities and local heritage in towns and cities that line the route of the former Chisholm Trail.

References

Further reading

 Guide Map of the Best and Shortest Cattle Trail to the Kansas Pacific Railway; Kansas Pacific Railway Company; 1875. (Read Online)(Map)
 Morality and Money: A Look at how the Respectable Community Battled the Sporting Community over Prostitution in Kansas Cowtowns, 1867-1885; Jessica Smith; Kansas State University; 2013. Read Online

External links

 The Texas Historical Commission Chisholm Trail mobile tour
 History on the trail from the "Kansas Heritage Group"
 Up the Chisholm Trail by the Williamson County Historical Commission
 Along the Chisholm Trail Web site with maps, history, monuments, and guides for visiting.
 The Chisholm Trail Heritage Museum Texas cowboy and Longhorn cattle drive history - Cuero, Texas
 On the Chisholm Trail Heritage Museum Chisholm Trail history and settlement of the Southern Great Plains of the US. - Duncan, Oklahoma
Maps
 Simplified map of the trail
 1873 map of the main trail and subsidiary trails
 Detailed map of the trail through Oklahoma
 Detailed map of the trail through Kansas

 
Historic trails and roads in Kansas
Historic trails and roads in Oklahoma
Historic trails and roads in Texas
Trails and roads in the American Old West